Besiberri Nord is a mountain of the Massís del Besiberri, Catalonia, Spain. Located in the Pyrenees, it has an altitude of 3009 metres above sea level.

See also
Besiberri Sud
Besiberri del Mig
Geology of the Pyrenees

References

External links 
 Ressenya des Cavallers

Mountains of Catalonia
Mountains of the Pyrenees
Pyrenean three-thousanders